Bergerac Périgord Football Cub, commonly known as Bergerac, is a football club founded in 1916 in Bergerac, Dordogne, France. As of the 2021–22 season, it competes in the Championnat National 2, the fourth tier in the French football league system. The club's home ground is the Stade de Campréal.

History
Bergerac Foot was formed in 1916 under the name EF Bergerac. The club achieved promotion to the CFA in 2008 after getting promoted from CFA 2. The club operates a reserve team and their kit manufacturer is the Italian sportswear company Kappa.

On 19 December 2021, Bergerac eliminated Ligue 1 side Metz from the Coupe de France following a 5–4 win on penalties in the round of 64. It was the first time that the club eliminated a first-tier side from the competition. In the round of 16 of the competition on 30 January 2022, Bergerac eliminated Ligue 1 club Saint-Étienne in a 1–0 victory. However, the side from Dordogne were eventually eliminated by fellow fourth-tier team Versailles in a penalty shoot-out in the quarter-finals.

Current squad

References

External links 
  

Association football clubs established in 1916
1916 establishments in France
Sport in Dordogne
Football clubs in Nouvelle-Aquitaine